Wilbur Wright College, formerly known as Wright Junior College, is a public community college in Chicago. Part of the City Colleges of Chicago system, it offers two-year associate's degrees, as well as occupational training in IT, manufacturing, medical, and business fields.  Its main campus is located on Chicago's Northwest Side in the Dunning neighborhood.

History

Wilbur Wright College was established in 1934 by the Chicago Board of Education as one of the system of three city junior colleges designed to serve the post-secondary educational needs of Chicago residents. For a three-year period during World War II, the U.S. Navy leased the facilities and trained thousands of men as part of the Electronics Training Program. The college remained in its initial location at 3400 N. Austin Ave. until moving to a new campus in 1993.

In 1966, Wright and the other city colleges were reorganized into a new community college district, named the City Colleges of Chicago, with its own Board of Trustees and taxing authority. This system includes colleges which, in turn, are a part of the State system comprising 40 public community college districts and 49 individual colleges.

Under the City Colleges of Chicago's new college to Careers initiative, Wright is City Colleges of Chicago's hub for Information Technology.

Campus

Wright College was originally located in a large building at 3400 N. Austin Avenue, in Chicago.  The original Wright campus is now home to the Chicago Academy Elementary School, the Chicago Academy High School, and the Academy for Urban School Leadership's central office. Due to needs for additional space and more specialised facilities, in 1993 it moved to a 23-acre parcel at 4300 N. Narragansett Avenue, at a cost of $90 million. The campus was designed by renowned Chicago-area architect Bertrand Goldberg In 2013, the school began a $3.5 million project to renovate and install new HVAC systems in the Learning Resource Center, a pyramid and one of the campus' landmarks.

Wright College is a leader in sustainability and was recognized as a Bronze Level Compact School in the Illinois Campus Sustainability Compact Program. The National Arbor Day Foundation has named Wright College as a Tree Campus USA for three consecutive years.

Humboldt Park Vocational Center
Humboldt Park Vocational Center is a satellite site of Wright College and offers classes that teach adult basic education skills, vocational training and other programs. The facility offers a nine-month advanced certification program in computerized numerical control (CNC) machining. In 2012, the CNC machining program placed 100 percent of its graduates into jobs paying $40,000 a year, with the potential to jump to $55,000 to $65,000 in less than two years.

Accreditation
Wilbur Wright College is accredited by the Higher Learning Commission and approved by the Illinois Community College Board and the Illinois Office of Education Department of Adult, Vocational, and Technical Education. The program in Radiography is accredited by the Joint Review Committee on Education in Radiologic Technology; the Business Department is accredited by the Association of Collegiate Business Schools and Programs; and the Occupational Therapy Assistant Program is accredited by the Accreditation Council for Occupational Therapy Education (ACOTE).
The paralegal program is accredited by the American Bar Association.

Notable alumni
 Jerry G. Bishop - Emmy Award-winning television personality
 Oscar Brashear - Jazz trumpeter
 Herbert C. Brown - Nobel Prize winner
 Dennis Franz - Emmy Award-winning actor
 Shecky Greene - Comedian
 Isaac Guillory - Folk guitarist
 Barbara Harris - Oscar-nominated actress
 Sally Insul - Actor
 M. Larry Lawrence - Hotelier and Ambassador to Switzerland
 Ted Lechowicz - Illinois politician
 Judith Leznaw  - American virologist, medical researcher and academic
 Eric Morris - Actor, acting teacher
 Chuck Nergard - Member of Florida House of Representatives
Akua Njeri - Activist and wife of Fred Hampton
 Kim Novak - Actress
 Ron Offen - Pulitzer Prize nominated poet, playwright, critic, and editor
 Bill Page - Lawrence Welk band leader, entrepreneur 
 Julius Pasculado - Basketball player for the Alaska Aces
 J.F. Powers - Novelist and short story author
 Mike Royko - Pulitzer Prize–winning journalist
 Al Schwartz (producer) - Emmy-nominated producer
 Bernard Stone - Alderman, mayoral candidate
 Lily Venson - Pulitzer Prize-nominated journalist

Notable faculty
 Ed Badger - Head basketball coach - Coach of the Chicago Bulls from 1976 to 1978
 Katherine Whitney Curtis - Swimming instructor - Founder of synchronized swimming
 Susan Fromberg Schaeffer - English instructor - National Book Award and O. Henry Prize nominated novelist and poet

Miscellaneous

Wilbur Wright College is host to the Scholars at Wright program, a great books program funded by the National Endowment for the Humanities.
Wilbur Wright College is host to the only ABA (American Bar Association)-approved Paralegal Studies Program at a public college in the City of Chicago.

References

External links
Wright College Website
Wright College Library homepage
 Wright College Library catalog
Scholars At Wright Website
Stage Wright Productions - Wright College Theater
Wright College Math Department app
3D Google Earth Model

 
Educational institutions established in 1934
Community colleges in Illinois
City Colleges of Chicago
1934 establishments in Illinois
Bertrand Goldberg buildings
Wright brothers